Kelly Stuart is an American playwright.

Life
She lived in Los Angeles.
She has been a New Dramatists writer in residence at The Royal National Theatre’s Studio in London.
She lives in New York, and teaches in the Theatre Department at Columbia University.

Awards
 2000 Whiting Award
 Guthrie New Play grant
 NYFA Fellowship
 Lark Artists Delegation to Romania

Works
 Ball and Chain, produced at the Padua Hills Playwrights Festival (1990)
 The Interpreter of Horror, produced at the Padua Hills Playwrights Festival (1991)
 Demonology, produced at the Padua Hills Playwrights Festival (1995) and at Playwrights Horizons (1996)
 The Square Root of Terrible, produced at The Mark Taper Forum, Los Angeles (1998) (theater for young audiences)
 Furious Blood, produced at Sledgehammer Theatre, San Diego (2001)
 The New New, Guthrie Theater (2002) (one-act play)
 Mayhem, produced at The Evidence Room, Los Angeles (2003)
 The Life of Spiders, produced by Holderness Theatre Company, New York City (2004)
 Homewrecker, produced at The Evidence Room, Los Angeles (2004)
 Bill of (W)Rights, Mixed Blood Theatre, Minneapolis (2004) (one-act as part of evening of short plays)
 Shadow Language, produced at Theatre503, London (2008)
 A Shoe Is Not a Question, presented by the A.S.K. Theater Projects, Los Angeles

References

External links
"Kelly Stuart", doollee
Profile at The Whiting Foundation

American dramatists and playwrights
Writers from Los Angeles
Columbia University faculty
Living people
Year of birth missing (living people)